Clymeniida is an order of ammonoid cephalopods from the Upper Devonian characterized by having an unusual dorsal siphuncle.

Morphologic characteristics 
Clymeniids produced a variety of shells ranging from smooth to ribbed and spinose and from evolute with all whorls exposed to strongly involute with the last whorl covering the previous.  Some were even triangular as viewed from the side (along the axis of coiling). With the exception of the first few chambers, all have a siphuncle that runs along the dorsal margin, along the inside of the coils, opposite that of most ammonoids.

The siphuncle starts off ventrally, like that in other ammonoids, but after the first few septa migrates to a definite and stable dorsal position.  Septal necks are retrosiphonate, characteristic of their nautiloid ancestors, and are commonly very long, forming an almost continuous siphuncular tube. Septa, characteristic of ammonoids, are convex toward the front.

Classification 
Miller, Furnish, and Schindewolf, 1957, in Part L of the Treatise on Invertebrate Paleontology included three superfamilies in the Clymeniida, the Gonioclymeniaceae, Clymeniaceae, and Parawocklumeriaceae. The Gonoclymeniaceae unites five families, the Clymeniaceae three. The Parawocklumeraceae was established for a single family, the Parawocklumeriidae.

Saunders, Work, and Nikoleava, 1999, divided the Clymeniida into two suborders, the Gonioclymeniina and the Clymeniina.   The Gonioclymeniina includes the Sellaclymeniaceae with 7 families and 20 genera, the Gonioclyemniacea, containing a single family with six genera, and the Parawocklumeraceae, also containing a single family, but with only three genera. The Clymeniina combines five families with a total of 36 genera into a single superfamily, the Clymeniaceae.

GONIAT Website  gives two suborders which fall into the Clymeniida. They are the Clymeniina with four superfamilies and  Gonioclymeniina, established for a single superfamily. In contrast, Dieter Korn, 2006 divided the Clymeniida into the Clymeniina with superfamilies and families, and Cyrtoclymenia, named by him in 2002. with superfamilies and families.  Shevyrev, 2006 on the other hand divided the Clymeniida into the Clymeniina and Gonioclymeniina, as with GONIAT and Saunders, Work, and Nikolaeva

Taxonomy 
Clymeniida 
Suborder Clymeniina Hyatt, 1884 
Superfamily Clymeniaceae Edwards, 1849
Family Clymeniidae Edwards, 1849
Genus Aktuboclymenia Bogoslovsky, 1979
Genus Clymenia Münster, 1834
Family Kosmoclymeniidae Korn and Price, 1987
Subfamily Kosmoclymeniinae Korn and Price, 1987
Genus Kosmoclymenia Schindewolf, 1949
Genus Linguaclymenia Korn and Price, 1987
Genus Lissoclymenia Korn and Price, 1987
Genus Muessenbiaergia Korn and Price, 1987
Subfamily Rodeckiinae Korn 2002
Genus Franconiclymenia Korn and Price, 1987
Genus Protoxyclymenia Schindewolf, 1923
Genus Rodeckia Korn, 2002
Superfamily Gonioclymeniaceae Hyatt, 1884
Family Costaclymeniidae Ruzhencev, 1957
Genus Costaclymenia  Schindewolf, 1920
Genus Endosiphonites Ansted, 1838
Family Gonioclymeniidae Hyatt, 1884
Genus Finiclymenia Price and Korn 1989
Genus Gonioclymenia Sepkoski, Jr., 2002
Genus Kalloclymenia Wedekind, 1914
Genus Leviclymenia Korn, 2002
Genus Mesoclymenia Bogoslovsky, 1981
Family Sellaclymeniidae Schindewolf, 1923
Genus Sellaclymenia Sepkoski, Jr., 2002
Family Sphenoclymeniidae Korn, 1992
Genus Medioclymenia Korn, 2002
Genus Sphenoclymenia Schindewolf, 1920
Superfamily Platyclymeniaceae , 1914
Family Glatziellidae Schindewolf, 1928
Genus Glatziella Renz, 1914
Genus Liroclymenia Czarnocki, 1989
Genus Postglatziella Schindewolf, 1937
Genus Soliclymenia Schindewolf, 1937
Family Piriclymeniidae Korn, 1992
Genus Ornatoclymenia Bogoslovsky, 1979
Genus Piriclymenia Schindewolf, 1937
Genus Sulcoclymenia Schindewolf, 1923
Family Platyclymeniidae Wedekind, 1914
Subfamily Nodosoclymeniinae Korn, 2002
Genus Czarnoclymenia Korn, 1999
Genus Nodosoclymenia Czarnocki, 1989
Genus Stenoclymenia Lange, 1929
Subfamily Platyclymeniinae Wedekind, 1914
Genus Fasciclymenia Korn and Price, 1987
Genus Platyclymenia Sepkoski, Jr., 2002
Genus Progonioclymenia Schindewolf, 1937
Genus Spinoclymenia Bogoslovsky, 1962
Genus Trigonoclymenia Schindewolf, 1934
Genus Varioclymenia Wedekind, 1908
Subfamily Pleuroclymeniinae Korn, 2002
Genus Borisiclymenia Korn, 2002
Genus Nanoclymenia Korn, 2002
Genus Pleuroclymenia Schindewolf, 1934
Genus Trochoclymenia Schindewolf, 1926
Superfamily Wocklumeriaceae Schindewolf, 1937
Family Parawocklumeriidae Schindewolf, 1937
Genus Kamptoclymenia Schindewolf, 1937
Genus Parawocklumeria Schindewolf, 1926
Genus Tardewocklumeria Becker, 2000
Genus Triaclymenia Schindewolf, 1937
Family Wocklumeriidae Schindewolf, 1937
Genus Epiwocklumeria Schindewolf, 1937
Genus Kielcensia Czarnocki, 1989
Genus Synwocklumeria Librovitch, 1957
Genus Wocklumeria Wedekind, 1918
Suborder Cyrtoclymeniina Korn, 2002
Superfamily Biloclymeniaceae Bogoslovsky, 1955
Family Biloclymeniidae Bogoslovsky, 1955
Genus Biloclymenia Schindewolf, 1923
Genus Dimeroclymenia Czarnocki, 1989
Genus Kiaclymenia Bogoslovsky, 1965
Genus Rhiphaeoclymenia Bogoslovsky, 1965
Family Pachyclymeniidae Korn, 1992
Genus Pachyclymenia Schindewolf, 1937
Genus Uraloclymenia Bogoslovsky, 1977
Superfamily Cyrtoclymeniaceae Hyatt, 1884
Family Carinoclymeniidae Bogoslovsky, 1975
Genus Acriclymenia Bogoslovsky, 1975
Genus Carinoclymenia Bogoslovsky, 1965
Genus Karaclymenia Bogoslovsky, 1983
Genus Pinacoclymenia Bogoslovsky, 1975
Family Cymaclymeniidae Hyatt 1884
Subfamily Cymaclymeniinae Hyatt, 1884
Genus Cymaclymenia Sepkoski, Jr., 2002
Genus Laganoclymenia Bogoslovsky, 1979
Genus Procymaclymenia Korn, 2002
Genus Rodachia Korn, 2002
Subfamily Genuclymeniinae Korn, 2002
Genus Flexiclymenia Czarnocki, 1989
Genus Genuclymenia Wedekind, 1908
Genus Siekluckia Czarnocki, 1989
Family Cyrtoclymeniidae Hyatt, 1884
Genus Cyrtoclymenia Sepkoski, Jr., 2002
Genus Hexaclymenia Schindewolf, 1923
Genus Praeflexiclymenia Czarnocki, 1989
Genus Pricella Korn, 1991
Genus Protactoclymenia Wedekind, 1908
Family Rectoclymeniidae Schindewolf, 1923
Genus Cteroclymenia Bogoslovsky, 1979
Genus Falciclymenia Schindewolf, 1923
Genus Karadzharia Korn, 2002
Genus Rectoclymenia Wedekind, 1908
Suborder Incertae sedis
Genus Borkinia
Genus Gyroclymenia
Genus Kazakhoclymenia
Genus Miroclymenia
Genus Schizoclymenia

References

 
Devonian ammonites
Late Devonian first appearances
Late Devonian animals
Late Devonian extinctions